JRS may refer to:

Businesses and organisations 
 Jesuit Refugee Service, a Catholic aid organisation
 JPMorgan Russian Securities, an investment trust

Places 
 Atarot Airport, Israel
 John Ruskin School, Cumbria, England
 Joseph Rowntree School, York, England

Other uses 
 Joseph Robert Smallwood (1900–1991), Canadian politician
 Journal of Roman Studies (first published 1911)
 Sikorsky JRS, a 1930s seaplane model

See also 
 Juniors (disambiguation)
 JR (disambiguation)